Kennett River is a small seaside town in Victoria, Australia.

History
The river running through the town was named by surveyor George Smythe after the River Kennet in Berkshire, England.

In 1882, Alex MacLennan and his cousins, the MacReas, were looking for an area suited to farming and fishing. MacLennan chose this site, which he named The Kennet. His cousins settled on the other side of the creek at a site named Wye River.

Kennett River Post Office opened on 15 December 1938 and closed in about 1984.

Tourism
The area is known for scenic coastal views, whale watching, the Great Otway National Park, and surfing. Although koala populations have declined across the country, Kennett River is still considered one of the best places in Australia to see them in the wild. The Victoria State Government has implemented plans in the Cape Otway area to manage the koala population and improve their health, though some of the actions taken have been controversial.

The area is also home to a variety of birds, including cockatoos, parrots, rosellas, owls, and kookaburras, and to glow-worms.

Kennett River has a Surf Lifesaving Club (SLSC) that was established in 1963.

References

External links

 Kennett River SLSC

Otway Ranges
Towns in Victoria (Australia)
Coastal towns in Victoria (Australia)